Girls in the House is the debut studio album by German girl group Preluders. It was released on 24 November 2003 by Cheyenne, Polydor and Zeitgeist. Entirely co-produced by Uwe Fahrenkrog-Petersen, and Gena Wernik, the album peaked at number 2 in Germany, number 4 in Switzerland, and number 5 in Austria, eventually receiving a gold certification for more than 100,000 albums sold. The album spawned three singles, including the promotional cover single "Losing My Religion", German number-one single "Everyday Girl", and bilingual "Bal Privé".

Track listing

Charts

Weekly charts

Year-end charts

References

2003 debut albums
Preluders albums
Polydor Records albums